Johan Van Overtveldt (born 24 August 1955) is a Belgian journalist and politician of the New Flemish Alliance (N-VA). He served as Minister of Finance of Belgium from 2014 until 2018.

Career
He was the chief editor of Trends from 2010 to 2013 and chief editor of Knack from 2011 to 2012.

In 2012 he was awarded the Prize for Liberty by the Flemish classical-liberal think tank Libera!.

Political career
In November 2013 Van Overtveldt switched over to politics, becoming a member of the New Flemish Alliance (N-VA). As main N-VA candidate for the 2014 European Parliament elections, he was elected as a member of the European Parliament.

Following the formation of the Michel Government in October 2014, Van Overtveldt became Minister of Finance in the government of Prime Minister Charles Michel; Sander Loones succeeded him as member of the European Parliament.

Since the 2019 elections, Van Overtveldt has been a member of the European Parliament, where he has been chairing the Parliament's Committee on Budgets. In addition, he is a member of the Committee on Economic and Monetary Affairs. In this capacity, he is the Parliament's rapporteur on the Multiannual Financial Framework for 2021–2027. 

In addition to his committee assignments, Van Overtveldt is also part of the Parliament's delegations for relations to Canada.

Other activities

European Union organizations
 European Investment Bank (EIB), Ex-Officio Member of the Board of Governors (2014-2018)
 European Stability Mechanism, Member of the Board of Governors (2014-2018)

International organizations
 African Development Bank (AfDB), Ex-Officio Alternate Member of the Board of Governors (2014-2018)
 Asian Development Bank (ADB), Ex-Officio Member of the Board of Governors (2014-2018)
 European Bank for Reconstruction and Development (EBRD), Ex-Officio Member of the Board of Governors (2014-2018)
 Inter-American Investment Corporation (IIC), Ex-Officio Member of the Board of Governors (2014-2018)
 International Monetary Fund (IMF), Ex-Officio Alternate Member of the Board of Governors (2014-2018)
 Joint World Bank-IMF Development Committee, Member (2014-2018)
 Multilateral Investment Guarantee Agency (MIGA), World Bank Group, Ex-Officio Member of the Board of Governors (2014-2018)
 World Bank, Ex-Officio Member of the Board of Governors (2014-2018)

Publications
Het einde van de Euro
Maandag geen economie meer?
The Chicago School: How the University of Chicago Assembled the Thinkers Who Revolutionized Economics and Business
Bernanke's test

References

External links

 

1955 births
Flemish politicians
Living people
MEPs for Belgium 2014–2019
MEPs for Belgium 2019–2024
New Flemish Alliance politicians
Finance ministers of Belgium
People from Mortsel